Hot Rolled Mild Steel Plates, Sheets and Strip (SPHC) is a Japanese industrial standard for hot rolled steel.

References

Steel
Industry in Japan